Garrett Park is a commuter rail station in Garrett Park, Maryland, USA. It is served by limited trains on the MARC Brunswick Line, some of which stop at the station and some of which are flag stops. The station has limited parking on the adjacent street.

Station layout
The station has two low-level concrete side platforms and a small shelter on the inbound platform. The shelter was originally located at the former Landover commuter rail station. The platform is long enough for three single-level cars to platform, although only one set of doors is typically opened. The station is not compliant with the Americans with Disabilities Act of 1990, lacking raised platforms for level boarding.

References

External links

Brunswick Line
Former Baltimore and Ohio Railroad stations
Garrett Park, Maryland
MARC Train stations
Railway stations in Montgomery County, Maryland